Horacio Armando de la Peña (born 1 August 1966), nicknamed "el Pulga" ("the Flea"), is a tennis coach and a former tennis player from Argentina, who reached a career-high singles ranking of World No. 31.

De la Peña was born in Buenos Aires. He began playing on the ATP circuit professionally in 1984, when he was 17. He won four ATP World Tour titles in his career, all of which were on clay. He also won six doubles titles – five on clay.

De la Peña is most well known as the former coach of Chilean Fernando González. He was also considered the unofficial captain of the Chilean Davis Cup team.

As well as González, de la Peña has coached other tennis players, like Franco Squillari, Martín Rodríguez, Guillermo Coria, and a number of other Chilean and Argentine tennis players.

De la Peña currently runs occasional tennis clinics in Santiago, Chile, and has his own tennis academy.

Career finals

Singles (4 wins, 2 losses) 

Source: ATP

Doubles (6 wins, 5 losses)

References

External links
 
 
 

1966 births
Living people
Tennis players from Buenos Aires
Tennis players from Santiago
Argentine expatriate sportspeople in Chile
Argentine male tennis players
Argentine tennis coaches